A certification mark (or conformity mark) on a commercial product indicates the existence of an accepted product standard or regulation and a claim that the manufacturer has verified compliance with those standards or regulations. The specific specification, test methods, and frequency of testing are published by the standards organization. Certification listing does not necessarily guarantee fitness-for-use. Validation testing, proper usage, and field testing are often needed.

The USPTO considers that a certification mark is a kind of trademark.

Certification marks distinguished from other marks 
Certification marks differ from collective trade marks. Collective trade marks may be used by particular members of the organization that owns them, while certification marks are the only evidence of the existence of follow-up agreements between manufacturers and nationally accredited testing and certification organizations. In some occasions, the certification organization will charge for the use of their labels and will require that the manufacturer reports the exact production quantities. In this case, the certification organization can be seen to earn a commission from sales of products under their follow-up regimes. In return, the use of the certification marks enables the product sales in the first place.

Certification is often mistakenly referred to as an approval, which is not true. Organizations such as Underwriters Laboratories, TÜV Rheinland, NTA Inc, and CSA International will test the products according to standard procedures and "list" them as compliant to that standard. They do not approve anything except the use of the mark to show that a product has been certified for compliance with such specific standard. Thus, for instance, a product certification mark for a fire door or for a spray fireproofing product does not signify its universal acceptance for use within a building. Approvals are up to the Authority Having Jurisdiction (AHJ), such as a municipal building inspector or fire prevention officer. Conversely, FM Global does use the term "Approvals" for its certification listings, which are intended for use of the products within buildings that are insured by FM Global. The German accreditor Deutsches Institut für Bautechnik (DIBt) issues "Approvals" for systems. All of these listed products must conform to listing and approval use and compliance.

For various reasons, usually relating to technical issues, certification marks are difficult to register, especially in relation to services. One practical workaround for trademark owners is to register the mark as an ordinary trademark in relation to quality control and similar services.

Certification marks can be owned by independent companies absolutely unrelated in ownership to the companies, offering goods or rendering services under the particular certification mark.

Regulations 
Trademark laws in countries, such as the United States, Australia, and others that provide for the filing of applications to register certificate marks also usually require the submission of regulations, which define a number of issues, including:

 People authorized to use the certification mark
 Characteristics that the certification mark certifies
 How the certification or standards tests these characteristics and supervises use of the mark
 What the dispute resolution procedures are

The main purpose of the regulations is to protect consumers against misleading practices.

Examples

International treaties and certification marks 
Many jurisdictions have been required to amend their trade mark legislation to accommodate protection of certification marks under the TRIPs treaty.

Some jurisdictions recognise certification marks from other jurisdictions. This means good manufactured in one country may need not go through certification in another. One example is the European Union recognition of Australia and New Zealand marks based on an International treaty.

Cases 
Cases involving certification marks include:
 Re Legal Aid Board's Trade Mark Application (unreported 3 October 2000, UK CA)
the Sea Island Cotton case [1989]RPC 87

See also

References

External links 

 List of Standard Certification Marks – description of the most common standard certification marks
 Risknowlogy Certification Marks – certification marks for risk, reliability, safety and SIL related products, solutions, services, organisations and professionals

 
Standards
Trademark law